Malawi 24 is a Malawi news, online only news website. The publication is one of the four online-only news websites in Malawi that include Nyasa Times, Maravi Post and Malawi Voice.

Reach
Malawi24 is one of the two most followed news publication in  Malawi alongside Nyasa Times according to Alexa ranking and an aggregation by Socialbakers.

Affiliation
Malawi24 is a United Nations Global Compact member. It is affiliated with Media Institute of Southern Africa (MISA) - Malawi Chapter, a media watch-dog organisation across Southern Africa. It is currently one of the Malawi news sources aggregated by allafrica.com and Google news

Facebook Partnership
In 2015, the publication partnered with Facebook for the Free Basics initiative to enable people in Malawi to have free access to news and current affairs without being charged data as the country has one of the highest data charges; yet only 5% of the total population access the internet.

Controversy
In 2015, Médecins Sans Frontières in Malawi threatened Malawi24 with legal action after publishing an article citing a BBC report that claimed HIV infection rates had doubled in Malawi. In its report, BBC had used data provided by MSF for areas where circumcision was also being promoted as a strategy for curbing HIV infection. BBC edited its version after a public outcry on its Facebook page after the Malawi24 report. The threat for legal action did not materialize despite the publication not retracting the story as MSF had demanded.

References

External links 
 Official Website

Malawian news websites
Internet properties established in 2013
2013 establishments in Malawi
African news websites